Danilo Pallares Echeverría is a Uruguayan writer and musician.

Writings and music

By way of contributing to Uruguayan regional cultural identity, Pallares is the author of the anthem 'Flores Hymn' (Spanish: 'Himno a Flores'). This work is sometimes sung on local, solemn occasions.

Pallares is an accomplished musician who, as at 2005, was specializing in the live music scene in Uruguay.

Musical genre

The tango — very commonly heard in Argentina and Uruguay — has been a particular genre of music with which Pallares has been identified.

References

See also 

 Himno a Flores#Description
 Music of Uruguay
 List of Uruguayan writers
 Flores Department#Notable people

Uruguayan male writers
Uruguayan composers
Male composers
Uruguayan music
People from Flores Department
Uruguayan people of Catalan descent
Living people
Year of birth missing (living people)